The 2011 Sparkassen Open was a professional tennis tournament played on clay courts. It was the 18th edition of the tournament which was part of the 2011 ATP Challenger Tour. It took place in Braunschweig, Germany between June 26 and July 3, 2011.

ATP entrants

Seeds

 1 Rankings are as of June 20, 2011.

Other entrants
The following players received wildcards into the singles main draw:
  Jaan-Frederik Brunken
  Thomas Muster
  Cedrik-Marcel Stebe
  Jan-Lennard Struff

The following players received entry as a special exemption into the singles main draw:
  Jan Hájek
  Björn Phau

The following players received entry from the qualifying draw:
  Victor Crivoi
  Evgeny Donskoy
  Dominik Meffert
  Júlio Peralta

Champions

Singles

 Lukáš Rosol def.  Evgeny Donskoy, 7–5, 7–6(7–2)

Doubles

 Martin Emmrich /  Andreas Siljeström def.  Olivier Charroin /  Stéphane Robert, 0–6, 6–4, [10–7]

External links
Official Website
ITF Search
ATP official site

Sparkassen Open
2011 in German tennis
Sparkassen Open